Between 1907 and 2007 there were over 132,200 alumni of the University of Saskatchewan. This list features notable people who have successfully graduated from a degree, certificate and/or diploma program at the university.

Agriculture
 Lorne Babiuk - immunologist, pathogenesist, virologist, molecular virology, and vaccinologist
 Howard Fredeen - animal breeding researcher
 Lawrence Kirk - agronomist best known for introducing crested wheatgrass
 J.W. Grant MacEwan - Director of the School of Agriculture, Professor of Animal Husbandry, and Lieutenant-Governor of Alberta (1966–1974)
 Kenneth Norrie - Canadian economic historian specializing in the economy of Western Canada, especially prairie wheat farming
 Cecil Frederick Patterson - introduced 52 new varieties of hardy fruits for the prairies and over 18 varieties of hybrid hardy lilies
 Clayton Oscar Person -  international authority on the genetics of host-parasite relations

Arts and entertainment 
 Robert Boyer - Canadian visual artist of aboriginal heritage; BEd from the Regina Campus of the U of S in 1971 
 Kim Coates - actor, honorary Doctor of Letters
 Stephen Fox - clarinet maker
 Garnet Hertz - Canadian artist, designer and academic; Canada Research Chair
 William G. Hobbs - physician, surgeon, major Canadian artist
 Ann James - English-born Canadian artist and educator
 Laurel Johannesson - artist
 Deborah Theaker - actress known as Casey Edison on the science fiction comedy show Manic Mansion
 Gordon Thiessen OC - Governor of the Bank of Canada; one of the "100 Alumni of Influence" from the U of S

Business 
 Tom Anselmi - President and COO of Maple Leaf Sports & Entertainment
 Marilyn Atkinson - President of Erickson Coaching International
 H. Douglas Barber - founder of Electrical Engineering Canadian; CEO of Gennum Corporation
 N. Murray Edwards - billionaire
 John E. Floyd - economist
 Chad Hamre - entrepreneur
 Daryl "Doc" Seaman, OC, honorary Doctor of Laws - businessman; one of the "100 Alumni of Influence" from the U of S
Arnold Tremere - Executive Director, government official (Canadian International Grains Institute)
 Steven Gregory Woods - entrepreneur
 Victor J. Zaleschuk - chair of the board of Cameco Corporation

Computers, engineering, and technology 
 Fred Mannering  - Professor University of South Florida, Clarivate Highly Cited Researcher
Permanand Mohan - Chief Examiner for the Caribbean Examinations Council's CAPE Examinations in Computer Science
 W. Brett Wilson - entrepreneur, philanthropist; former Dragon's Den panelist; co-founder of FirstEnergy Capital; founder, President, and Chairman of Prairie Merchant Capital; Chairman of Canoe Financial

Educators
 Dominique Abrioux - former President of Athabasca University
 John Hall Archer - librarian, historian, civil servant, first President of the University of Regina
 Reginald John Godfrey Bateman - professor of English
 George Fredrick Curtis - dean of the University of British Columbia Faculty of Law
 R. Peter MacKinnon - lawyer, legal academic, President of the U of S
 Darin Nesbitt - instructor of political science at Douglas College in New Westminster, B.C.
 A K M Siddiq - 18th Vice-Chancellor of the University of Dhaka. 
 Paul Thagard - Professor of Philosophy, with cross appointment to Psychology and Computer Science, and Director of the Cognitive Science Program, at the University of Waterloo
 Henry (Harry) George Thode, CC, MBE, FRSC - president and vice-chancellor of McMaster University; one of the "100 Alumni of Influence" from the U of S

Environmentalists
 Richard St. Barbe Baker - English forester, environmental activist, and author
 Jim MacNeill - consultant, environmentalist, and international public servant

Historians
 Frank Kusch - historian of American history

Journalism/publishing/broadcasting 
 Eric Malling - television journalist
 Sally Merchant - television personality and political figure

Law, government, and public policy 
 Don Atchison - mayor of Saskatoon, Saskatchewan
 Pat Atkinson - politician
 Chris Axworthy - politician
 Gordon Barnhart - University Secretary, professor in Canadian Politics, former Lieutenant-Governor of Saskatchewan
 Dave Batters - politician
 Edward Dmytro Bayda - Chief Justice of Saskatchewan
 Clément Chartier - Métis Canadian leader
 Brooke Claxton - veteran of World War I, federal Minister of National Health and Welfare and Minister of National Defence honorary Doctor of Laws degree from the U of S
 Eric Cline - politician
 Roméo Dallaire, OC, CMM, GOQ, MSC, CD - senator, humanitarian, author and retired general; honorary Doctor of Laws degree from the U of S
 Jonathan Denis - 23rd Minister of Justice of Alberta and notable Calgary lawyer
 Grant Devine - Progressive Conservative Premier
 John Diefenbaker, CH, PC, QC - 13th Prime Minister of Canada; university's chancellor; he and his wife were buried at the university, near the Diefenbaker Canada Centre
 Noah Evanchuk - 2011 Canadian Federal Election candidate ,  Saskatchewan 
Provincial Court Judge
 Laurie Evans - politician
 Clarence Fines - provincial treasurer of Saskatchewan
 Jon Gerrard, PC - politician and medical doctor
 Ralph Goodale, PC - Minister of Agriculture, Minister of Natural Resources, Minister of Public Works, Minister of Finance, Minister of Public Safety and Emergency Preparedness
 Alvin Hamilton, PC - politician
 Robert Hanbidge, honorary Doctor of Laws - lawyer, municipal, provincial and federal politician, and Lieutenant-Governor of Saskatchewan
 Lynda M. Haverstock - Lieutenant-Governor of Saskatchewan (2000–2006); Leader of the Saskatchewan Liberal Party
 Benjamin D. Heppner - school teacher, businessman and politician
 John Hewson - Australian politician
 Ray Hnatyshyn - 24th Governor General of Canada
 Constance D. Hunt - lawyer, legal academic, and judge
 Gerard Jennissen - politician
 Fredrick W. Johnson - 16th Lieutenant-Governor of Saskatchewan
 Gordon Kirkby - politician, mayor and lawyer
 Otto Lang, PC, OC, QC - politician
 Léonard Hilarion Joseph Legault - diplomat
 Murdoch MacPherson, QC - Attorney-General of Saskatchewan; honorary Doctor of Civil Law degree from U of S
 Jim Maddin - Mayor of Saskatoon
 James Mallory - jurist; academic; constitutional expert; instructor in political science at U of S
 Anthony Merchant, Q.C. - Saskatchewan lawyer
 Edward Cyril Malone - Saskatchewan lawyer and politician
 Harold Hugh MacKay, OC, QC - lawyer and corporate director
 William McIntyre, CC (born 1918) - retired Puisne Justice of the Supreme Court of Canada
 Stewart McLean - Manitoba politician
 Gary Merasty, M.P. - politician; one of the "100 Alumni of Influence" from the U of S
 George Porteous - 14th Lieutenant Governor of Saskatchewan
 Robert Gordon Robertson, PC, CC FRSC - Commissioner of the Northwest Territories
 Roy Romanow, PC, OC, SOM, QC - politician and former Premier of Saskatchewan; one of the "100 Alumni of Influence" from the U of S
 David Rodney - politician, teacher, and professional speaker
 Tillie Taylor - judge, first chair of the Saskatchewan Human Rights Commission
 Andrew Thomson - Minister of Finance of Saskatchewan
 William Ferdinand Alphonse Turgeon - politician and diplomat
 John Thomas Wolfe - Canadian provincial politician
 Stephen Worobetz, OC, MC, SOM - physician and former Lieutenant Governor of Saskatchewan; one of the "100 Alumni of Influence" from the U of S
 Clifford Wright - mayor of Saskatoon; honorary Doctor of Laws
 Iva Yeo - politician

Literature 
 William Barr - Arctic historian; U of S faculty member
 Dennis Cooley - poet
 Lorna Crozier, a.k.a. Lorna Uher - poet
 Dawn Dumont, author, BA 1995
 Sarah Ens, poet
 Richard Epp - playwright
 Michael Helm - novelist
 Maureen Hunter - playwright
 Eli Mandel - poet and literary academic
 William Sarjeant, geologist and novelist
 Joseph Schull - playwright and historian
Tasha Spillett-Sumner - writer and educator
 Guy Clarence Vanderhaeghe, OC, SOM - fiction author; one of the "100 Alumni of Influence" from the U of S
 William Whitehead- writer, actor and filmmaker

Medicine 
 Hulda Regehr Clark - naturopath, author, and controversial practitioner of alternative medicine
 Emmett Matthew Hall, CC, QC - jurist and civil libertarian; considered one of the fathers of the Canadian system of Medicare
 Franklin M. Loew - one of the team that developed canola oil; recipient of the Queen's Jubilee Medal
 Charles Randal Smith - head pediatric forensic pathologist

Nobel Prize winners
 Gerhard Herzberg - Nobel Prize in Chemistry, 1970; was offered a position in 1935 to flee Nazi Germany, and remained at the university for ten years
 Henry Taube, FRSC - Nobel Prize in Chemistry, 1983

Philosophy
 Zenon Pylyshyn - cognitive scientist and philosopher

Science 
 Sylvia Fedoruk - University Chancellor, professor in Oncology, Associate Member in Physics, and Lieutenant-Governor of Saskatchewan (1988–1994)
 William Sarjeant - geologist and novelist
 Elizabeth Scarr, researcher in Neuropathology
 Raymond Thorsteinsson - Canadian geologist of the high Arctic; one of the "100 Alumni of Influence" from the U of S]
  Thorbergur Thorvaldson - scientist and first dean of graduate studies at the U of S
 James Till O.C., O.Ont., F.R.S.C. - biophysicist, medical researcher who demonstrated the existence of stem cells; one of the "100 Alumni of Influence" from the U of S

Sociologists
 Samuel Delbert Clark - sociologist

Sports 

 Kelly Bates - B.C. Lions, CFL and U of S Saskatchewan Huskies football player
 Rod Bryden - owner of the Ottawa Senators; professor of law at U of S
 Tyson Craiggs - B.C. Lions, CFL and U of S Saskatchewan Huskies football player
 Cyprian Enweani - sprinter
 George Genereux - physician and trap shooting gold medal winner
 Charles Cecil Hay - ice hockey player, organizer, and administrator
 Diane Jones-Konihowski, C.M. - pentathlete
 Dave King - hockey coach
 Gene Makowsky - Saskatchewan Roughriders lineman of the CFL
 Shannon Miller - hockey coach
 Sandra Schmirler, SOM, BSPE - curler; Olympic and triple World Champion; one of the '100 Alumni of Influence" from the U of S
 Don Wittman - nationally recognized sports broadcaster in Canada
 Viola Yanik - wrestler

Theology
 Maurice Baudoux - priest and Archbishop of Saint Boniface, Manitoba
 Walter H. Farquharson - hymn-writer
 Herbert V. Günther - Buddhist; professor and Head of the Department of Far Eastern Studies at the U of S 
 Muzaffar Iqbal - founding president of the Center for Islam and Science
 Raymond L. Schultz - National Bishop of the Evangelical Lutheran Church in Canada

Honorary degree recipients 
 Arnold Davidson Dunton, CC, Doctor of Laws, honoris causa - educator and public administrator
 Charles Cecil Hay, honorary doctorate - ice hockey player, organizer, and administrator

See also
 University of Saskatchewan academics

Notes

References
 University of Saskatchewan - 100 Alumni of Influence

 
University of Saskatchewan alumni
Saskatchewan, University Of Saskatchewan Alumni